Jose Antonio Dias was the Angolan minister for geology and mines in the 1994 government of José Eduardo dos Santos.

See also
Politics of Angola

References

Living people
Year of birth missing (living people)
Place of birth missing (living people)
Government ministers of Angola
20th-century Angolan politicians